Vindhyachal railway station is a small railway station in Mirzapur district, Uttar Pradesh. Its code is BDL. It serves Vindhyachal city. The station consists of three platforms. The platforms are not well sheltered. It lacks many facilities including water and sanitation.

Trains 

 Bhagalpur–Anand Vihar Terminal Garib Rath Express
 Chambal Express
 Magadh Express
 Shipra Express
 Mahabodhi Express
 Howrah Mumbai Mail
 Triveni Express
 Rajendranagar Express
 Mahananda Express
 Udyan Abha Toofan Express
 Tapti Ganga Express
 Howrah–Jodhpur Express
 Shaktinagar Terminal–Bareilly Triveni Express
 Barauni–Gondia Express

References

Railway junction stations in India
Railway stations in Mirzapur district
Allahabad railway division